2080 Jihlava, provisional designation , is a stony Flora asteroid from the inner regions of the asteroid belt, approximately 6 kilometers in diameter. The asteroid was discovered on 27 February 1976, by Swiss astronomer Paul Wild at Zimmerwald Observatory near Bern, Switzerland. It was named after the Czech city of Jihlava.

Orbit and classification 

Jihlava is a member of the Flora family, one of the largest groups of stony asteroids in the main-belt. It orbits the Sun in the inner main-belt at a distance of 2.0–2.3 AU once every 3 years and 3 months (1,173 days). Its orbit has an eccentricity of 0.06 and an inclination of 4° with respect to the ecliptic.

Physical characteristics 

The asteroid has been characterized as a common S-type asteroid.

The best rated rotational lightcurve of Jihlava gave rotation period of 2.70876 hours with a brightness variation of 0.15 magnitude.

According to the survey carried out by NASA's Wide-field Infrared Survey Explorer with its subsequent NEOWISE mission, Jihlava measures 5.765 kilometers in diameter and its surface has an outstandingly high albedo of 0.633, while the Collaborative Asteroid Lightcurve Link assumes an albedo of 0.24 — derived from 8 Flora, the family's largest member and namesake – and calculates a diameter of 7.14 kilometers with an absolute magnitude of 12.9.

Naming 

This minor planet was named after the city of Jihlava in the Czech Republic. The Moravian town, by the river of the same name was founded in the 11th century and is the country's oldest mining town with a community that prospered from rich silver deposits. The municipal and mining laws of Jihlava were to become a model for analogous regulations all over the world.

The name was proposed by astronomer Ivo Baueršíma, a geodesist at the University of Berne and co-discoverer of the minor planet 9711 Želetava, in honor of his native town. The official  was published by the Minor Planet Center on 1 July 1979.

References

External links 
 Asteroid Lightcurve Database (LCDB), query form (info )
 Dictionary of Minor Planet Names, Google books
 Asteroids and comets rotation curves, CdR – Observatoire de Geneve, Raoul Behrend
 Discovery Circumstances: Numbered Minor Planets (1)-(5000) – Minor Planet Center
 
 

 

002080
Discoveries by Paul Wild (Swiss astronomer)
Named minor planets
19760227